The All-Party Parliamentary Group for Tribal Peoples was a group in the UK Parliament, chaired by Martin Horwood MP, that was founded in 2007. Its stated aim was to "raise parliamentary and public awareness of tribal peoples".

During its operation, the Group met two or three times a year and one of its main objectives is to press for ratification of ILO Convention 169 on the rights of indigenous and tribal peoples. The British international indigenous rights organization Survival International worked as its secretariat, and also funded occasional group receptions and events.

The Chair, Martin Horwood MP, lost his seat in the 2015 general election and the group was not reformed during the new parliamentary session.

See also

 All-Party Parliamentary Group
 Indigenous rights

References

External links
 APPG for Tribal Peoples - Official Website
 Article on a meeting hosted by APPG for Tribal Peoples

Tribal Peoples
Indigenous rights organizations in Europe
2007 establishments in the United Kingdom
Organizations established in 2007